Aeruginascin or N,N,N-trimethyl-4-phosphoryloxytryptamine is an indoleamine derivative which occurs naturally within the mushrooms Inocybe aeruginascens and Pholiotina cyanopus, and Psilocybe cubensis. Aeruginascin is the N-trimethyl analogue of psilocybin. It is closely related to the frog skin toxin bufotenidine (5-HTQ), a potent 5-HT3 receptor agonist, but the aeruginascin metabolite 4-HO-TMT shows strong binding at the 5-HT2 receptors similar to psilocin. The first scientific literature about the pharmacological effects of aeruginascin is from a study published by Gartz in 1989. Across 23 analyzed cases of accidental hallucinogenic mushroom poisonings, people who had ingested the mushroom Inocybe aeruginascens reported only euphoric experiences. This is in contrast to the slight and in some cases extremely dysphoric experiences reported from the accidental ingestion of non aeruginascin containing mushrooms (containing solely psilocybin and psilocin).

References 

Tryptamine alkaloids
Psychedelic tryptamines
Mycotoxins
Organophosphates